Marantz is a company that develops and sells high-end audio products. The company was founded in New York, but is now based in Japan.

The first Marantz audio product was designed and built by Saul Marantz in his home in Kew Gardens, New York. The company had a major influence in the development of high fidelity audio systems, and reached the high point of their success in the mid to late 1970s.

During the 1980s, while owned by Philips, a pioneer in compact disc technology, Marantz sold some very well received CD players, but other products in the line were not as successful as in the past. Beginning in the early 1990s, Marantz focused on higher-end components. In 2001, Marantz Japan acquired the brand from Philips and owned all overseas sales subsidiaries.

In 2002 Marantz merged with competitor Denon into D&M Holdings Inc., later named D+M Group. On March 1, 2017, Sound United LLC completed the acquisition of D+M Holdings.

History
 1952 Saul Marantz sells his first audio product, the "Consolette" pre-amp
 1964 Marantz acquired by Superscope Inc.
 1966 Beginning with the Model 25, and then 22 and 28, Marantz starts manufacturing its products in Japan through a partnership with Standard Radio Corp.
 1974 A manufacturing plant is opened on the Péronnes-lez-Binche site, Walloon Region, Belgium 
 1975 Standard Radio Corp. changes its name to Marantz Japan Inc.
 1980 Superscope sells the Marantz brand, dealer network, and all overseas assets (except U.S. and Canada) to Philips Electronics
 1983 Marantz's audio enhancement technology (Marantz Enhanced Digital Stereo) is introduced
 1992 Philips acquires U.S. and Canada trademarks and dealer network
 1997 Saul Marantz dies aged 85
 2001 Marantz Japan Inc. acquires the brand and all overseas sales subsidiaries
 2002 Marantz Japan and Denon merge to form D&M Holdings, to later be joined by other higher-end audio equipment brands such as Boston Acoustics
 2008 Philips sells its remaining stake in D&M Holdings, ending a 28-year relationship between Philips and Marantz
 2014 Marantz Professional acquired by inMusic Brands
 2017 Sound United LLC acquires D+M Holding
 2019 Ken Ishiwata dies aged 72

Products
Selected products:

Marantz 2325 Receiver
Marantz 5420 Cassette Deck
Marantz 2275 Receiver
Marantz 2600 – Marantz's most powerful receiver
Marantz 10b Tuner
Marantz 2385 Receiver
Marantz HD77 – Four-way, high-fidelity loudspeaker system
Marantz PMD-660 – solid-state recorder
 Marantz CD63, CD63SE and variants - iconic CD player range
 Marantz UD7007 - Universal HD Blu-ray player
 Marantz PM-KI Ruby - Ken Ishiwata signature reference 2 channel integrated amplifier
 Marantz MM8077 - 7 channel amplifier with XLR and RCA inputs
 Marantz M-CR612 - Network CD  receiver
 Marantz SR7011 - 9.2 Channel Network Receiver
 Marantz SR8012 - 11.2 Channel Network AV Receiver
 Marantz SR8015 - 11.2 Channel Network Flagship AV Receiver
 Marantz AV8805 - 13.2 Channel Network AV Pre-Amplifier

References

External links

 Marantz global
 Marantz America
 Saul B. Marantz
 Online Audio Museum "TheVintageKnob"
 Marantz HiFi classics and history 1960 ~ 1985 (German)
 Ben Blish's original Classic Marantz Gear Website since 1997, the web's first Classic Audio Website

Companies based in Kanagawa Prefecture
Audio equipment manufacturers of Japan
Audio amplifier manufacturers
Consumer electronics brands